Major General Christopher James Bell,  is a former British Army officer.

Military career
Bell was commissioned into the Scots Guards. He became commanding officer of 1st Battalion Scots Guards in 2010, Commander 77th Brigade in May 2017 and Programme Director for Project Castle, which aims to develop a modern career structure in the Army, in December 2018. He became General Officer Commanding Army Recruiting and Initial Training Command in June 2020.

He was awarded the Queen's Commendation for Valuable Service in recognition of his services in Iraq in October 2003. He was also appointed an OBE in recognition of his services in Afghanistan in July 2008 and advanced to CBE in the 2020 New Year Honours.

His career came to an end in January 2021, when he was asked to resign from the Army following an inappropriate relationship with a female subordinate.

References

British Army major generals
Scots Guards officers
Commanders of the Order of the British Empire
Recipients of the Commendation for Valuable Service
Year of birth missing (living people)
Living people